is a former Japanese football player.

Career
He has previously played for Kawasaki Frontale, making a single appearance for the side in the 2007 AFC Champions League in the final group stage match away to Bangkok University.

Club statistics

References

1988 births
Living people
Association football people from Kanagawa Prefecture
Japanese footballers
J1 League players
Kawasaki Frontale players
Association football midfielders